A Room square, named after Thomas Gerald Room, is an n × n array filled with n + 1 different symbols in such a way that:
 Each cell of the array is either empty or contains an unordered pair from the set of symbols
 Each symbol occurs exactly once in each row and column of the array
 Every unordered pair of symbols occurs in exactly one cell of the array.

An example, a Room square of order seven, if the set of symbols is integers from 0 to 7:

It is known that a Room square (or squares) exist if and only if n is odd but not 3 or 5.

History
The order-7 Room square was used by Robert Richard Anstice to provide additional solutions to Kirkman's schoolgirl problem in the mid-19th century, and Anstice also constructed an infinite family of Room squares, but his constructions did not attract attention. Thomas Gerald Room reinvented Room squares in a note published in 1955, and they came to be named after him. In his original paper on the subject, Room observed that n must be odd and unequal to 3 or 5, but it was not shown that these conditions are both necessary and sufficient until the work of W. D. Wallis in 1973.

Applications
Pre-dating Room's paper, Room squares had been used by the directors of duplicate bridge tournaments in the construction of the tournaments. In this application they are known as Howell rotations. The columns of the square represent tables, each of which holds a deal of the cards that is played by each pair of teams that meet at that table. The rows of the square represent rounds of the tournament, and the numbers within the cells of the square represent the teams that are scheduled to play each other at the table and round represented by that cell.

Archbold and Johnson used Room squares to construct experimental designs.

There are connections between Room squares and other mathematical objects including quasigroups, Latin squares, graph factorizations, and Steiner triple systems.

See also 
 Combinatorial design
 Magic square
 Square matrices

References

Further reading

Combinatorial design